Belver may refer to places in Portugal:
 Belver (Carrazeda de Ansiães), a civil parish in the municipality of Carrazeda de Ansiães 
 Belver (Gavião), a civil parish in the municipality of Gavião